Jeff Simpson (born 29 October 1950) is a former professional tennis player from New Zealand.

Playing career
Over the course of his career, Simpson competed in five Davis Cup ties for the New Zealand team. He won a total of four rubbers, two in singles and two in doubles. 

In 1973, Simpson reached the third round of both Wimbledon and the US Open. Those performances saw him reach his career best ranking of 66.

Simpson was a singles semi-finalist at Newport in 1973 and Auckland in 1975. As a doubles player he was runner-up at three Grand Prix events, in Tokyo, Christchurch and Roanoke.

Coaching
Simpson was New Zealand's Davis Cup captain for 16 years, from 1984 to 1999, as well as Fed Cup captain for five years. He also coached New Zealand in the 1988 Summer Olympics and 1996 Summer Olympics.

Personal life
Simpson is the elder brother of Russell Simpson, who was also a professional tennis player.

His son, Matt, competed for a while on the Futures circuit, retiring in 2013.

Grand Prix career finals

Doubles: 4 (1 title, 3 runner-ups)

Challenger titles

Singles: (1)

References

1950 births
Living people
New Zealand male tennis players
New Zealand tennis coaches
Sportspeople from Hamilton, New Zealand